Sandra Reynolds Price (née Reynolds; born 4 March 1934) is a South African former tennis player who won four Grand Slam women's doubles championships and one Grand Slam mixed doubles championship. Her best Grand Slam singles result was reaching the 1960 Wimbledon final, losing to Maria Bueno 8–6, 6–0. Reynolds is the only South African woman to reach the Wimbledon singles final, and is one of three to have reached a major singles final. In 1961, she was seeded No. 1 for the Wimbledon singles event, making her the only South African player (man or woman) ever to be seeded first in a singles major. She was the runner-up at the 1959 U.S. Women's Clay Court Championships, losing to Sally Moore in the final. Price won the German Championships in 1960, 1961, and 1962. She was the runner-up at the 1959 Italian Championships, having defeated Bueno in the semifinals, then losing to Christine Truman in the final.

According to Lance Tingay of the Daily Telegraph and the Daily Mail, Price was ranked in the world top 10 from 1959 through 1962, reaching a career high of world no. 3 in 1960.

Price teamed up with fellow South African Renée Schuurman to win all four of her Grand Slam women's doubles titles. They won the Australian Championships in 1959 and the French Championships in 1959, 1961, and 1962. In addition, they were the runners-up at Wimbledon in 1960 and 1962. Price teamed with Bob Mark to win the mixed doubles title at the 1959 Australian Championships, defeating Schuurman and Rod Laver in the final in three sets.

On 28 October 1961, she married Lowell Price, a horse breeder, in Bloemfontein, and they have one daughter.

Grand Slam finals

Singles: 1 runner-up

Doubles:  6  (4 titles, 2 runners-up)

Mixed Doubles: 1 title

Grand Slam singles tournament timeline

See also 

 Performance timelines for all female tennis players who reached at least one Grand Slam final

References

External links
 

South African female tennis players
Living people
1934 births
Grand Slam (tennis) champions in women's doubles
Grand Slam (tennis) champions in mixed doubles
Sportspeople from Bloemfontein
Australian Championships (tennis) champions
French Championships junior (tennis) champions